The 2018 1. deild kvinnur (also known as Betri deildin kvinnur for sponsorship reasons) was the 34th season of women's league football in the Faroe Islands. EB/Streymur/Skála were the defending champions, having won their first title the previous season. The season started in 11 March and ended on 26 October.

Format
Each team plays each other four times for a total of 20 matches. There is no relegation.

Teams

Notes

League table

Results

Top scorers

References

1. deild kvinnur seasons
Faroe Islands
women
women